Napoleon as Mars the Peacemaker is a bronze cast of the marble sculpture of the same name by Antonio Canova. It was commissioned from Canova in spring 1807 by Charles-Jean-Marie Alquier, French ambassador to Rome, commissioned it from Canova for 5,000 Louis as a gift to Eugene de Beauharnais, viceroy of the Kingdom of Italy. It was cast in 1811 and De Beauharnais sent it to Milan in May 1812, but the city found it difficult to find a site for it. It was finally moved to its present site in the main courtyard of the Palazzo di Brera (now the Pinacoteca di Brera and inaugurated there on 14 August 1859 during Napoleon III's visit.

Sculptures of the Pinacoteca di Brera
Sculptures of Napoleon
1810s sculptures
Bronze sculptures
Sculptures by Antonio Canova
Tourist attractions in Milan
Mars (mythology) in art
Sculptures of Roman gods